Lingesh, also credited as Lijeesh is an Indian actor who has worked in the Tamil film industry.

Career 
Lingesh was born on December 26 in Thiruporur, Tamil Nadu. He did his schooling at Thiruporur Govt Higher Secondary School, before joining Loyola College for his undergraduate degree and went on to do a postgraduate course at the Madras Christian College. With a strong desire to build a career in the visual medium, he joined as an assistant director to director Kavitha Barathy, notably working on the television series Salanam in 2003. During the mid-2000s, Lingesh anchored shows on the Sun Network, Zee Tamil, and Vendhar TV, while working as an RJ in Suryan FM, while attempting to break into acting. He also worked as an event host, notably compering promotional events of films such as Padikkadavan (2008) and Kanthaswamy (2009).

Lingesh was first selected to play the lead role in Balaji Sakthivel's coming-of-age drama Kalloori (2007) opposite Tamannaah, but was later dropped in favour of fellow debutant Akhil, who wanted a more rural-looking actor. Lingesh eventually debuted as an actor in I. Ahmed's Endrendrum Punnagai in a supporting role, before associating with Pa. Ranjith on his critically acclaimed Madras (2014), playing the role of Lijeesh. The name became interchangeably used as his stagename, as he was able to secure another role in Ranjith's Kabali (2016) featuring Rajinikanth. For the role, he put on over ten kilograms for the role.

He starred in Nelson Venkatesan’s Oru Naal Koothu (2016) and appeared in a significant role in Pariyerum Perumal (2018). Following this he acted in films including Gajinikanth (2017), Jada (2019), Irandam Ulagaporin Kadaisi Gundu (2019), V1 (2019) and Taanakkaran (2022). He also worked as executive producer for Neelam Productions in Pariyerum Perumal and Irandam Ulagaporin Kadaisi Gundu.

Lingesh first worked as the protagonist on the social drama College Road (2022), and will next be seen in Kayal (2023) opposite Gayathrie and Swagatha Krishnan.

Filmography

References

External links 

Indian film actors
Tamil actors
Living people
Actors in Tamil cinema
Year of birth missing (living people)
21st-century Indian actors
Male actors in Tamil cinema